The 2016 FIBA U20 European Championship Division B was the 12th edition of the Division B of the FIBA U20 European Championship, the second-tier level of the European Under-20 basketball championship. The tournament was played in Chalkida, Greece, from 15 to 24 July 2016. Montenegro won gold by beating Iceland in the final, 78–76. Montenegro, Iceland, and Greece won promotion to Division A.

Participating teams

 
  (19th place, 2015 FIBA Europe Under-20 Championship Division A)
  (20th place, 2015 FIBA Europe Under-20 Championship Division A)
  (17th place, 2015 FIBA Europe Under-20 Championship Division A)

  (15th place, 2015 FIBA Europe Under-20 Championship Division A)
  (18th place, 2015 FIBA Europe Under-20 Championship Division A)

 

  (14th place, 2015 FIBA Europe Under-20 Championship Division A)

  (16th place, 2015 FIBA Europe Under-20 Championship Division A)

First round
In this round, the 21 teams are allocated in one groups of six teams and three groups of five teams. The top two teams in each group advance to the Second round. The other teams will play in the Classification Games.

Group A

Group B

Group C

Group D

Classification round

17th–21st place classification

Group E

Group F

Armenia will play for 17th place; Estonia will play for 19th place.

19th place game

17th place game

9th–16th place classification

5th–8th place classification

Final round

Quarterfinals

Semifinals

Third place game

Final

Final standings

Awards

All-Tournament Team
  Kári Jónsson 
  Jón Axel Guðmundsson
  Lovro Mazalin  
  Vassilis Charalampopoulos
  Zoran Nikolić

References

External links
FIBA official website

FIBA U20 European Championship Division B
2016–17 in European basketball
2016–17 in Greek basketball
International youth basketball competitions hosted by Greece
Chalcis
July 2016 sports events in Europe